Her Mother's Hope is a fictional romance novel written by Francine Rivers in 2010. The novel made The New York Times Best Seller list in April 2010.

Plot
Her Mother's Hope follows a family as they discover what sacrifices it takes to show unconditional love. As the first in a family saga, the story begins with Marta Schneider as she leaves Switzerland and embarks upon a journey that will forever change the course of her family's history. As she suffers wars and hardships, she is determined to have her way until she has kids of her own. Her stubbornness gives her strength to raise strong children. But Hildemara, her oldest daughter, misinterprets this strength for distance. As World War II approaches, Hildie forges her own path to win her mother's respect. But when an illness overtakes her, will her own daughter misinterpret her love as distance as well?

References

External links 
Official site

2010 American novels
Novels by Francine Rivers
American romance novels
Historical romance novels
Tyndale House books